"Dreamer" is a song by Swedish dance music duo Axwell & Ingrosso featuring Canadian singer-songwriter Trevor Guthrie. The song was released on 8 December 2017. A progressive house remix was released by Russian dance music duo Matisse and Sadko on February 2, 2018.

Charts

Weekly charts

Year-end charts

Certifications

References

2017 singles
2017 songs
Axwell & Ingrosso songs
Songs written by Axwell
Songs written by Elof Loelv
Songs written by Salem Al Fakir
Songs written by Sebastian Ingrosso
Songs written by Vincent Pontare
Trevor Guthrie songs